John Dunlop may refer to:
John B. Dunlop (born 1942), American political scientist
John Boyd Dunlop (1840–1921), Scottish/Irish inventor of the pneumatic tyre and founder of the Dunlop rubber company
John Colin Dunlop (1785–1842), Scottish historian
John Dunlop (racehorse trainer) (1939–2018), British horse-racing trainer
John Gibb Dunlop (1844–1913), Scottish engineer and shipbuilder
John T. Dunlop (Virginia politician) (1842–1907), American politician in the Virginia House of Delegates
John Thomas Dunlop (1914–2003), American administrator, former US Secretary of Labor
John Dunlop of Dunlop (1806–1839), British Member of Parliament for Kilmarnock Burghs
John Dunlop (American football) (1874–1957), American football coach
John Dunlop (chess player) (1886–?), New Zealand chess champion
John Dunlop (curler) (born 1975), American curler
John Dunlop (Unionist politician) (1910–1996), former MP for Mid Ulster
John Dunlop (minister) (born 1939), Irish Presbyterian minister
John Dunlop (writer) (1755–1820), Scottish songwriter and writer

See also
Jack Dunlop (c. 1872–1900), outlaw of the American Old West
John Dunlap (1747–1812), first printer of the Declaration of Independence
Bellefonte Forge House, Pennsylvania, also known as the John Dunlop House